Mark Ferdinand Treffers (born 16 December 1953) is a former swimming representative from New Zealand and 1974 Commonwealth Games gold medalist who specialised in long distance freestyle and medley races.

He was born in Invercargill and was taught to swim at the Waverly Swimming Club before moving to Christchurch to train at the Wharenui Swim Club under legendary New Zealand coach Pic Parkhouse.

Commonwealth Games 
At the 1970 British Commonwealth Games held in Edinburgh, he won the bronze medal in the 1500 m freestyle in a time of 16:44.69.

At the 1974 British Commonwealth Games held in Christchurch, he won the gold medal in the men's 400m Individual Medley on the same day fellow New Zealander and Wharenui team-mate Jaynie Parkhouse won a gold medal in the 800m Freestyle. Treffers would go on to claim a silver medal in the men's 1500m Freestyle, his main race, as he become just the seventh man in history to break 16 minutes finishing behind Australian Stephen Holland.

Olympic Games 
He competed at both the 1972 and 1976 Summer Olympics with his best result being 6th place in the 1500 m at the 1972 Munich Olympic Games.

British Championship 
Despite being from New Zealand he won the 'Open' British Championship over 880 yards freestyle and the 1970 1650 yards freestyle title.

Personal life 
Treffers studied law at the University of Canterbury while training for the Commonwealth Games before becoming a lawyer in Australia after retiring from swimming.

Marks son Ben Treffers represented Australia in swimming, winning a gold medal in the 50m Backstroke at the 2014 Glasgow Commonwealth Games.

Mark Treffers Drive in New Brighton and Treffers Road in Wigram are named after him.

See also
 List of Commonwealth Games medallists in swimming (men)

References

1953 births
Commonwealth Games gold medallists for New Zealand
Commonwealth Games silver medallists for New Zealand
Commonwealth Games bronze medallists for New Zealand
New Zealand male freestyle swimmers
Swimmers at the 1970 British Commonwealth Games
Swimmers at the 1974 British Commonwealth Games
Olympic swimmers of New Zealand
Swimmers at the 1972 Summer Olympics
Swimmers at the 1976 Summer Olympics
Living people
Commonwealth Games medallists in swimming
20th-century New Zealand people
Medallists at the 1970 British Commonwealth Games
Medallists at the 1974 British Commonwealth Games
New Zealand male medley swimmers